The Tropic of Cancer is the most northerly circle of latitude of the Earth's tropics region.

Tropic of Cancer may also refer to:

Tropic of Cancer (novel), 1934 novel by Henry Miller
Tropic of Cancer (film), 1970 film based on the Henry Miller novel
Tropic of Cancer (TV series), 2010 BBC TV series